Hardinghen is a commune in the Pas-de-Calais department in the Hauts-de-France region of France.

Geography
A farming village located 12 miles (18 km) south of Calais, at the junction of the D127 and D191 roads.

Population

Places of interest
 The church of St. Marguerite, rebuilt in the 19th century.
 A château dating from the eighteenth century.
 The eighteenth-century château de la Trésorerie, destroyed in 2006.
 Hardinghen also has an annual fête.

References

Communes of Pas-de-Calais